The Hyundai Ioniq 5 is a battery electric compact crossover SUV produced by Hyundai since 2021. It is the first product to be marketed under the electric cars-focused Ioniq sub-brand, and the first model developed on the Hyundai Electric Global Modular Platform (E-GMP).

Overview 
The Ioniq 5 was revealed globally on 23 February 2021. Its design was previewed by the Hyundai 45 EV Concept which was presented at the Frankfurt Motor Show in September 2019. Both the concept car and the production version are inspired by the original Hyundai Pony, and features the Parametric Pixel design that is applied to the headlights, tail lights, and wheels. The vehicle's clamshell hood spans the entire width to make a sleek look with the 20-inch aerodynamic wheels. The "45" describes both the 45th anniversary of the Pony coupe and the 45-degree angles prominent on the sides of the concept. At the time, Hyundai called the design language "sensuous sportiness" and described the front and rear lights as carrying a "kinetic cube" theme.

The Ioniq 5 was developed under the project code NE as the first vehicle to be based on the E-GMP platform. The dedicated electric vehicle platform enables the vehicle to adopt a fully flat interior floor with a 3-meter long wheelbase. The rear legroom space was achieved by making the front seats approximately 30 percent thinner than typical seats.

The dashboard of the Ioniq 5 is dominated by two  screens, one for the instrument cluster display and the other for the infotainment system under one piece of glass. It is equipped with an optional head-up display with augmented reality support. Many of the interior parts are made from recycled materials, including PET bottles. The Ioniq 5 can be optioned with a single large glass panel roof without any support beams.

The Ioniq 5 also features a front trunk, which has a  capacity for the RWD version (except North America), while the AWD model and all North American versions have a  capacity, due to the extra mechanical components underneath to support the front electric motor. It has the ability to charge electrical equipment through the built-in V2L (Vehicle to Load) function. It can supply up to 3.6kW of power from the port mounted under the rear seats (except Australia) and from another port installed outside. The exterior port is able to supply power even if the vehicle is turned off.

In some markets, the Ioniq 5 is offered with an optional Digital Side Mirror (DSM) which replaces the conventional side mirrors with cameras and OLED screens.

Markets

United States 
The Ioniq 5 was released in the U.S. in May 2021, and went on sale in December 2021 as a 2022 year model. The initial model year is equipped with a 77.4 kWh battery. The entry-level models are powered by a rear-mounted single motor producing , while the more powerful models are available as a dual-motor version with AWD and  power output. Specific to the American and Canadian Ioniq 5, the vehicle is equipped a marker inside the headlamps, and tail lamps that blink completely as turn indicators.

Europe 
Initial models of the Ioniq 5 in Europe was offered with a choice of two battery packs (58 kWh and 72.6 kWh), three power outputs and either rear or four-wheel drive. During its introduction, a limited edition called the Project 45 was available, and only 3,000 units were made.

In April 2022, the Ioniq 5 received a larger battery for the European market. Optional Digital Centre Mirror (DCM) and Digital Side Mirrors (DSM) also became available.

Indonesia 
The Ioniq 5 was introduced in Indonesia in March 2022, and went on sale in April 2022. It is assembled in the country at Hyundai's plant in Cikarang, West Java.

Singapore 
The Ioniq 5 was released in Singapore in January 2023. Assembled in the country at the Hyundai Motor Group Innovation Centre facility, it is the first vehicle assembled in Singapore in more than 40 years. The plant will initially import the vehicle's fully painted body shell from the Indonesian plant, while other parts are imported from South Korea. The first 100 units are designated as the "First 100" limited edition, with "First 100" badging, "First 100" debossing on the seats, and commemorative number plates.

India 
The Ioniq 5 was introduced in India in January 2023 at the Auto Expo. It is Hyundai’s second electric offering for India after the Kona Electric, which was available in the country since 2019.

Powertrain 
The vehicle is available with 58kWh or 72.6kWh battery capacity options, while the North American version will only be available with the 58kWh or 77.4kWh batteries.

The 800V inverter is sourced from Vitesco Technologies, a subsidiary of the Continental group. A five minutes charge will add  to its range by WLTP standards.

Concepts and prototypes

Robotaxi 
The Ioniq 5 Robotaxi was unveiled on 31 August 2021 and displayed at IAA Mobility 2021 on 6 September 2021. Lyft began offering transport by driver-less Ioniq 5 Robotaxis on the Las Vegas Strip on 16 August 2022. The Ioniq 5 Robotaxi will have a human driver present until the end of 2022, after which the cars will operate on their own.

Ioniq 5 with e-Corner 
A modified version of the Ioniq 5 was showcased by Hyundai Mobis at the 56th Consumer Electronics Show in Las Vegas, U.S. The vehicle is equipped with an "e-Corner" system which allows it to perform a crab walk, tank turn, diagonal driving and pivot turn. It features an in-wheel motor design that also integrates brake and steer by wire technology as well as an electric damper into a single package. Each wheel can accelerate, brake and steer independently.

Sales

Awards 
 Car of the Year 2021, Mid-size Company Car of the Year 2021, and Premium Electric Car of the Year 2021 from Auto Express at the New Car Awards 2021.
 Won 2021 IDEA Design Award gold prize.
 2022 New Zealand Car of the Year
 2022 German Car of the Year
 2022 'Best Import Cars of the Year' by Auto Bild, winning the "Electric Car" category.
 Ranked 2022 No. 1 Electric Car by Autozeitung, receiving the highest score among electric cars.
 Best Design at the 'Top Gear Electric Awards 2021'.
 2022 World Car of the Year, World Electric Vehicle of the Year and World Car Design of the Year from World Car Awards.
 2022 EV of the Year, Car and Driver
 2022-2023 Japan Import Car of the Year

References

External links 

 

5
Cars introduced in 2021
Compact sport utility vehicles
Crossover sport utility vehicles
Rear-wheel-drive vehicles
All-wheel-drive vehicles
Production electric cars
Retro-style automobiles